was a railway station in the city of Yokote, Akita Prefecture,  Japan, operated by JR East. The station closed on 12 March 2022.

Lines

The station is closed during the winter months.

Station layout
The station consists of a single side platform serving bi-directional traffic.  The station is unattended.

History
Hiraishi Station opened on July 15, 1963 as a station on the Japan National Railways (JNR). The station was absorbed into the JR East network upon the privatization of the JNR on April 1, 1987.

Starting on December 1, 2016, the station will be closed seasonally during the winter months (December - March).

Hiraishi Station closed on March 12, 2022.

Surrounding area

See also
List of railway stations in Japan

References

External links

 JR East Station information 

Railway stations in Japan opened in 1963
Railway stations in Akita Prefecture
Railway stations closed in 2022
Kitakami Line
Yokote, Akita